Fiane is a village in Gjerstad municipality in Agder county, Norway. The village is located along the Norwegian County Road 418, just east of the European route E18 highway. The Fiane area is part of the Eikeland urban area which has about 600 residents (2017). One of the schools for Gjerstad municipality is located in Fiane.

References

Villages in Agder
Gjerstad